1812: The Rivers of War is a 2005 alternate history novel by American writer Eric Flint.

The book was originally published in hardcover as simply The Rivers of War. In 2006, the text was made available at the Baen Free Library.

Plot introduction
The story, which takes place in 1814–15, centers around an alternate historical version of the War of 1812. The point of divergence occurs at the Battle of Horseshoe Bend in March 1814, where Sam Houston, who was seriously injured in real history, sustains only a minor injury and is able to continue fighting. This leads to many changes down the line, culminating in the formation of the Confederacy of the Arkansas.

Major themes
Much of the novel, like many of Eric Flint's novels, focuses on the motivations of those involved in warfare. British general Robert Ross is a viewpoint character in the novel, and much time is devoted to his place as a "gentleman soldier" leading the British forces.

Another strong theme in the book is that of Indian rights. During the early part of the 19th century, westward expansion was squeezing the Cherokee and other Indian tribes out of lands they occupied east of the Mississippi River, which culminated in the infamous Trail of Tears, as the forced relocation of the Cherokee in 1838 came to be called. In the novel, the characters all seem to have a sense of inevitability about the whole affair, and know the time to preserve what they have is limited. In fact, Flint himself acknowledges that the intent of the novel (and its sequels) was to create a viable, alternate historical scenario in which the Trail of Tears did not occur, and he could envision no such scenario except one in which the Cherokee leave the East willingly and decades ahead of the actual historical timeline while still in full possession of their wealth and power.

Historical figures appearing in the novel
 Sam Houston, U.S. officer
 Robert Ross, British general
 Andrew Jackson, U.S. general
 Winfield Scott, U.S. general
 Major Ridge, Cherokee leader
 James Madison, U.S. president
 James Monroe, U.S. Secretary of State
 John Ross, Cherokee leader
 Charles Ball, Navy gunner with the Chesapeake Bay Flotilla, born a slave in Maryland.
 Joshua Barney, Commodore of the Chesapeake Bay Flotilla

Reception
Publishers Weekly gave the book a positive review, stating, "Flint (1632) offers historical figures rarely seen in fiction, such as James Monroe, in pre-Doctrine days, and the British general Robert Ross (not killed outside Baltimore); thorough scholarship in Napoleonic-era warfare; and strong, credible women. Fans will cheer even louder if this outstanding start turns out to be the first of a long saga."

Sequel
The first published sequel is 1824: The Arkansas War.

References

External links
 SF Site review
 ericflint.net: "About the Rivers of War" (afterword by Eric Flint)
 1812: The Rivers of War (free etext)

Books by Eric Flint
2005 American novels
American alternate history novels

Fiction set in 1814
Fiction set in 1815
War of 1812 books
Del Rey books